Di Fara Pizza is a pizzeria located at 1424 Avenue J in the Midwood section of Brooklyn, New York City. Situated between East 14th and East 15th Streets, the restaurant has been owned and operated by Domenico DeMarco (1936–2022) since 1965.

Food critics and bloggers have regularly cited it as one of the best pizzerias in New York City. Di Fara has been labeled the "Best pizza in New York" several times by many publications, including New York and the online publication Serious Eats. The New York Times called the restaurant "one of the most acclaimed and sought-after pizza shops in New York City". In 2011, Zagat gave the restaurant the top pizza restaurant food rating in New York City, and in 2013, Frommer's called its pizza "the Best Hand-Made Pizza in New York City". Chef Anthony Bourdain also praised the restaurant's pizza.

History
Domenico DeMarco emigrated from the Province of Caserta, Italy, in 1959 and opened Di Fara Pizza in 1965. He said in a 2004 interview:

On March 17, 2022, Dom DeMarco died at the age of 85.

Description

Pizza
Each pizza pie is handmade by DeMarco, so the pizzeria is closed when he is not available. Three of his seven children work in the back area of the restaurant.

He makes 100 to 150 pies a day. DeMarco uses imported ingredients – flour, extra-virgin olive oil, San Marzano tomatoes, buffalo mozzarella cheese from Casapulla, freshly grated grana padano (a slightly salty hard cow's milk cheese), three types of mozzarella cheese, and hand-grated Parmigiano Reggiano cheese are all from Italy, and the basil and oregano are from Israel. In a windowsill flower box, he grows thyme, oregano, basil, rosemary, and hot peppers. He cuts fresh basil over each pie with a pair of kitchen scissors. In July 2009, Di Fara raised its price for a plain slice of pizza from $4 to $5, becoming the first $5-a-slice pizza place in New York City.

When Di Fara's opened 1965, a slice was 15 cents. After the NY World's Fair, the price jumped to 25 cents. Today, Di Fara's still sells NYC's most expensive slice at $5. However, a large 8 slice pie is $30 which comes out to $3.75 a slice.

Restaurant
The nondescript restaurant is located on Avenue J next to a 99 cent store.  The restaurant only has 15 seats, but the pizzeria is so popular that crowds sometimes form on the sidewalk outside, as the wait can be as long as one to two hours.

Di Fara's has been closed numerous times by the NYC health department in 2007, 2011, and again in 2018 due to unsanitary conditions. It was also closed for a while in 2019 over unpaid state taxes.

Reviews

In his 1998 book The Eclectic Gourmet Guide to Greater New York City, Jim Leff called the sauce used by the restaurant: a restrained, low profile masterpiece of optimal acidity and spicing (bolstered by a goodly shake of black pepper). Like everything here it's delicious in a magically old-fashioned way.

Since The Village Voice, a New York City newspaper in Lower Manhattan, put DeMarco on its cover and proclaimed it as one of the "Best Italian restaurants", Di Fara has been regarded as a top pizzeria by publications like the Daily News.  Di Fara has received many awards, and has been labeled the "Best... pizza in New York" several times by many publications, including New York and the online publication Serious Eats. In 2004, The New York Times critic Eric Asimov called it "surely the best by-the-slice pizza in New York", and in 2006, The New York Sun called it "the city's finest pizza".

In 2007, chef Anthony Bourdain called the restaurant's pizza "the best of the best" in the book Kitchen Confidential Updated Ed: Adventures in the Culinary Underbelly. In 2008, The Village Voice wrote that "the best pizza in all New York is at Di Fara's", and Zagats gave it a food rating of 27, placing it among the top 15 restaurants of any type in New York City. The New York Times wrote in 2009 that Di Fara is "one of the most acclaimed and sought-after pizza shops in New York City".

In 2011, Zagats again gave the restaurant a food rating of 27, the top pizza restaurant food rating in New York City.  That year, the New York Daily News readers rated it the #1 pizza in the city. In 2013, Zagats yet again gave the restaurant a food rating of 27, with a decor rating of 6.  Also in 2013, Frommer's called its pizza the Best Hand-Made Pizza in New York City.

During the 2013 New York mayoral campaign, Democratic nominee (and later, Mayor) Bill de Blasio declared Di Fara to be the best pizza in the city.
The NYC health department closed Di Fara's numerous times in 2007, 2011, and 2018 for violations of its code.

Gallery

See also
 List of restaurants in New York City
 Pizza by the slice

References

Further reading
 The New York Observer on June 12, 2007: Pizzeria One With Everything—Except the Health Department
 New York Times on July 18, 2004: Domenico DeMarco told reporter Jeff Vandam secrets of the slice

External links
 
 What is DiFara's? A short video about Di Fara Pizza

Italian-American culture in New York City
Midwood, Brooklyn
Pizzerias in New York City
Restaurants established in 1965
Restaurants in Brooklyn
1965 establishments in New York City